Michael or Mike Hoffman may refer to:

Sports
Mike Hoffman (ice hockey, born 1963), Canadian ice hockey player (retired), who played for the Hartford Whalers
Mike Hoffman (ice hockey, born 1980), American ice hockey player (retired), who played in the Toronto Maple Leafs organization
Mike Hoffman (ice hockey, born 1989), Canadian ice hockey player, in the Montreal Canadiens organization
Moe Hoffman, American soccer player

Others
Michael Hoffman (congressman) (1787–1848), New York representative
Michael A. Hoffman (1944–1990), archaeologist 
Michael Hoffman (director) (born 1956), American film director
Michael A. Hoffman II (born 1957), Holocaust denier

See also
Michael Hofmann (disambiguation)
Michael R. Hoffmann, American environmental engineer
Mike Hoffmann (fl. 1980–2021), American musician